The Cambridge Central Mosque is Europe's first eco-friendly mosque and the first purpose-built mosque within the city of Cambridge, England. Its mandate is to meet the needs of the Muslim community in the UK and beyond by facilitating good practice in faith, community development, social cohesion and interfaith dialogue. The Cambridge Central Mosque was opened to the public on 24 April 2019.

Background 

The Muslim Academic Trust (MAT) proposed the site location to be situated in the Romsey area of Mill Road in Cambridge. Thereafter, the Cambridge Mosque Project was established in 2008 by Timothy Winter, a lecturer in Islamic studies at the University of Cambridge, to raise funds for the project.

After the £4m purchase of a one-acre site in 2009 on Mill Road, Marks Barfield Architects was appointed to design the new mosque in association with Professor Keith Critchlow, a world leading expert in sacred architecture and Islamic geometry, along with the UK's leading Islamic garden designer Emma Clark. 

Marks Barfield Architects are known for innovative designs, such as the London Eye and Kew Gardens' Treetop Walk, to name a few. Plans for the mosque were submitted to Cambridge City Council by the MAT and it was approved in 2012. However, the project was controversial and it was met with objections.

With its emphasis on sustainability and high reliance on green energy, the mosque is Europe's first eco-mosque. In addition to the mosque's dedicated areas (ablution, teaching, children's area, morgue), there is a café, teaching area and meeting rooms for use by the local Muslim and non-Muslim communities. It can accommodate up to 1,000 worshippers.

Donors from Europe, the Middle East, Asia and the Americas have supported the project, but most of the donations, around two-thirds of the total, came from Turkey. Construction started in September 2016, was completed in March 2019, and the mosque opened to the public on 24 April 2019. In 2021, the mosque was the subject of a profile on the Sky Arts programme The Art of Architecture.

Stirling Prize shortlisting
In 2021, Cambridge Central Mosque was among six buildings shortlisted for the Stirling Prize. It was the winner of that year's People's Vote.

Gallery

See also 
 Cambridge Muslim College

References

External links 
Cambridge Central Mosque
Cambridge Islamic Art - A sister project in aid of Europe's 1st eco-mosque!
Cambridge Muslim College

Videos 
 Cambridge Mosque Project - YouTube.com
 Shaykh Hamza Yusuf on the Cambridge Mosque Project - YouTube.com
 First Look Video The Cambridge Mosque Experience - YouTube.com
 Cambridge Mosque 2011 Summer Stroll Trailer - YouTube.com

Mosques in England
Buildings and structures in Cambridge
Religion in Cambridge